The 1963–64 Scottish Cup was the 79th staging of Scotland's most prestigious football knockout competition. The Cup was won by Rangers who defeated Dundee in the final.

First round

Replays

Second round

Replays

Third round

Replays

Quarter-finals

Replays

Semi-finals

Final

Teams

See also 
 1963–64 in Scottish football
 1963–64 Scottish League Cup

External links
 Video highlights from official Pathe News archive

Scottish Cup seasons
1963–64 in Scottish football
Scot